Michi Meko (born 1974) is an American multidisciplinary artist based in Atlanta, Georgia. He is the recipient of the Joan Mitchell Foundation Grant and the Atlanta Artadia Award as well as a finalist for the 2019 Hudgens Prize. His work incorporates the visual language of naval flags and nautical wayfinding, combined with romanticized objects of the American South. Throughout his various platforms, his work engages contradictions and paradoxes that he uncovers through examining his personal history, African American folk traditions, and narratives that confront or circumvent established narratives.

In 2019, Meko was featured on Hulu streaming as an Artist in Residence.

Grants and awards 
2019: The Hudgens Prize, finalist
2018: Working Artist Project, Museum of Contemporary Art, Georgia
2017: Atlanta Artadia Award
2017: Joan Mitchell Foundation Grant
2015: DashBoard Co-Op Residency Grant
2013: Wonderroot CSA Grant
2013: Flux Projects Grant
2011: Studio Artist in Residence, Atlanta Contemporary
2010: BeltLine Atlanta Grant
2010: Idea Capital Grant
2008: Forward Arts Foundation, finalist
2005: Forward Arts Foundation, finalist

Solo exhibitions 

2022: Dark was the Night, Cold was the Ground, Kavi Gupta, Chicago, Illinois
2020: Black and Blur, Clark Atlanta University Art Museum, Atlanta, Georgia
2019: Out Here by Myself, Alan Avery Art Company, Atlanta, Ga
2019: When It's Black Outside, Chimento Contemporary, Los Angeles, Ca
2019: And Then There Was Sky, Sumter County Gallery of Art, Sumter, South Carolina
2018: It Doesn't Prepare You for Arrival, Museum of Contemporary Art, Georgia, Atlanta, Ga
2018: Like A Weird Sweet Spot, Westobou Gallery, Augusta, Ga
2017: One Last Smile Before the Undertow, Dodd Gallery, University of Georgia, Athens, Ga
2016: Circle of Rivers, University of North Georgia, Dahlonega, Ga
2015: Pursuit: Almost Drowned, Alan Avery Art Company, Atlanta, Ga
2010: Navigating this American Landscape, Archetype Gallery, Atlanta, Ga
2009: Fear Kills Pursuit: A Mighty Roar and the Magic Inside, Beep Beep Gallery, Atlanta, Ga
2008: Comfort Kills Pursuit: Fight!!!, EyeDrum, Atlanta, Ga

Group exhibitions 

 2022: The Dirty South: Contemporary Art, Material Culture, and the Sonic Impulse, Crystal Bridges Museum, Bentonville, Arkansas 
 2021: Realms of Refuge, Kavi Gupta, Chicago, Illinois
 2021: The Dirty South: Contemporary Art, Material Culture, and the Sonic Impulse, Virginia Museum of Fine Arts, Richmond, Virginia

Collections 
High Museum of ArtMuseum of Contemporary Art, GeorgiaVirginia Museum of Fine Arts

References

External links

1974 births
Artists from Atlanta
University of North Alabama alumni
People from Florence, Alabama
African-American artists
Living people
21st-century African-American people
Painters from Alabama
20th-century African-American people